Temnora atrofasciata is a moth of the family Sphingidae. It is known from Forests from western Africa to Congo and Uganda, with an apparently isolated population in the Usambara Mountains.

The length of the forewings is about 22 mm for males and 24 mm for females. The forewings are fairly broad. The body and forewings are brown. There is a broad dark brown band running from the tornus to the costa. It is straight and well defined proximally, but irregular and strongly indented distally. The apical area is paler than the basal area. The hindwings are very dark brown, but slightly paler at the costa. The abdominal tufts are buff. The ground colour of females is darker and the wide dark band is much less contrasting. This dark band merges with the paler apical area distally.

References

Temnora
Moths described in 1889
Lepidoptera of Uganda
Lepidoptera of West Africa
Lepidoptera of the Republic of the Congo
Lepidoptera of Gabon
Lepidoptera of Tanzania
Moths of Sub-Saharan Africa